Juliette Segers was a Belgian sprinter. She competed in the women's 4 × 100 metres relay and women's 800 meters at the 1928 Summer Olympics and was eliminated in the preliminary heats of both events.

References

External links
 

Year of birth missing
Year of death missing
Athletes (track and field) at the 1928 Summer Olympics
Belgian female sprinters
Belgian female middle-distance runners
Olympic athletes of Belgium
Place of birth missing
Olympic female sprinters